The flora consists of many unique varieties of tropical plants. Blessed with a tropical climate and roughly 17,000 islands, Indonesia is the nation with the second highest biodiversity in the world. The flora of Indonesia reflects an intermingling of Asian, Australian and unique, Indonesian lineages. This is due to the geography of Indonesia, located between the aforementioned continents.
The archipelago consists of a variety of regions, from the tropical rain forests of the northern lowlands and the seasonal forests of the southern lowlands through the hill and mountain vegetation, to subalpine shrub vegetation. With the second longest coastline in the world, Indonesia also has many swamps and other varieties of coastal vegetation. Combined, these all give rise to a huge floral biodiversity.
There are about 28,000 species of flowering plants documented in Indonesia, including 2500 orchids, 122 species of bamboo, over 350 species of rattan and 400 species of Dipterocarpus, including ebony, sandalwood and teakwood.
Indonesia is also home to some unusual species of carnivorous plants. One exceptional species is known as Rafflesia arnoldi, named after Sir Thomas Stamford Raffles and Dr. Thomas Arnold, who discovered the flower in the depths of Bengkulu, southwest Sumatra. This parasitic plant has the largest flower of any plant, does not produce leaves and grows only on one species of liana on the rainforest floor. Another unusual plant is Amorphophallus titanum from Sumatra. Numerous species of insect trapping pitcher plants (Nepenthes spp.) can also be found in Borneo, Sumatra, and other islands of the Indonesian archipelago. There are a staggering 6000 traditional medicinal plants used as Jamu.,

Origins of Indonesian Flora 
The origin of flora in Indonesia is a result of geographical and geological events involving the Asian and Australasian continents. The present island of New Guinea was connected with the Australian continent, forming a supercontinent called Gondwana. This supercontinent began to break up 140 million years ago, and the New Guinea region moved towards the equator. As a result, animals from New Guinea travelled to the Australian continent and vice versa, resulting in large amounts of speciation in the many new ecosystems. This exchange continued to occur until the two landmasses separated completely.

Asian lineages in Indonesia are the result of the reformation of the Laurasia supercontinent, which existed after the break-up of Rodinia around 1 billion years ago. Around 200 million years ago, the Laurasian supercontinent split completely, forming the continents of Laurentia (now the Americas) and Eurasia. Despite this separation, the mainland of the Eurasian continent was not separated completely from the Indonesian archipelago. As a result, organisms from the Eurasian mainland could colonize the archipelago; and, under different environmental pressures, new species diverged.

In the nineteenth century, Alfred Russel Wallace proposed the idea of the Wallace Line, which is a line that divides Indonesian archipelago into two regions, the Asian biogeographical region (Sundaland) and the Australasian biogeographical Region (Wallacea). The line runs through the Indonesian Archipelago, between Borneo and Sulawesi (Celebes); and between Bali and Lombok.

The Indonesian archipelago, home of the Spice Islands, has been known since ancient times as a source of spices, such as cloves, nutmeg, and black pepper. The Maluku Islands were, until the late eighteenth century, the only source of many economically significant spices. In the colonial era, cloves and nutmeg were the most valuable commodities behind gold and silver for European colonists. During the colonial era in Indonesia, the Dutch also created many plantations of coffee, tea and sugar cane, mostly in Java.

During the history of Indonesia, many foreign plants from India, China, and Europe have been introduced to the archipelago. Plant species such as tea, coffee and rubber tree have become established.

Vegetation Types 

Indonesia's terrestrial flora can be divided into several vegetation groups. The most important factor is rainfall, followed by temperature, both of which affect the availability of water. The distribution of Indonesian flora is dominated by broadleaf evergreen forests. This is mostly seen in the regions where population density is still relatively low, such as Sumatra, Borneo, Sulawesi and West Papua. On Java and Bali the vegetation is dominated by cultivated plants. Swamp forests, mangrove, and Nypa fruticans forests are found along the coast. On the mountainous regions, subalpine and alpine vegetation is dominant. In the lesser Sunda islands, where rainfall is not as plentiful as in other parts of Indonesia, grasslands are regularly seen.

Biodiversity  

According to the Conservation International, there are two biodiversity regions in Indonesia: Wallacea and Sundaland.  The provinces of West Papua and Papua are also extremely biodiverse. Lorentz National Park, located in the province of Papua, was declared a World Heritage Site in 1999 by UNESCO.

Sundaland 
Sundaland, which is located on the west part of the Indonesian archipelago, holds about 25,000 different species of plants. 15,000 of them are endemic to this region and cannot be found anywhere else. Scyphostegiaceae is a plant family represented by a single species, Scyphostegia borneensis, which is endemic to Borneo. Another 155 species of Dipterocarpus are endemic to this island. Borneo also has more than 2,000 species of orchids. The forests in Sumatra include more than 100 species of Dipterocarpus, nearly a dozen of them are endemic to this island. The island of Java has about 270 endemic orchid species.

At least 117 plant genera are endemic to this biodiversity hotspot. 59 of them are found in Borneo and 17 in Sumatra. Unique plants from this region are similar to ones from the Asian continent, examples include Rafflesia arnoldii, pitcher plants and Javanese Edelweiss (Anaphalis javanica) as examples.

Wallacea 

It is estimated that there are over 10,000 species of plants in this biodiversity hotspot region. About 1,200 species and 12 genera are endemic. The island of Sulawesi has about 500 endemic plant species. The islands of Molucca have about 300 endemic plant species and the Lesser Sunda Islands are home to at least 110 endemic plant species. Little is known about the flora of this region. Three of these unique species, Agathis, Pterocarpus indicus and Eucalyptus deglupta, are examples.

Papua Barat and Papua 

The flora of this region is influenced by the Australian continent. This region contains a wide array of environments, from snow-capped mountains, lowland wetlands, to tropical marine environment. This geographical variation results in a large diversity of plant species. In 2020, a group of 99 researchers published a checklist of the flora of New Guinea, presenting a total number of 13,634 species that occur on the island with 7,616 species occurring in the Indonesian part, the Papua Barat and Papua Provinces. An astonishing 60-90% of them may be endemic to New Guinea and according to recent estimation the endemic plants encompasses 68% of the total known species. This region has been poorly explored so the actual number of endemic species is unknown.

Indonesia's National Flowers
Melati (Jasminum sambac), a small white flower with a sweet fragrance, is the national flower of Indonesia, together with Anggrek Bulan (Phalaenopsis amabilis) and Padma Raksasa Rafflesia (Rafflesia arnoldii). All three were chosen on World Environment Day on 5 June 1990 by President Soeharto. On another occasion Bunga Bangkai (Titan arum) was also added as puspa langka together with Rafflesia. Each individual province also has its own floral emblems.

National Love Flora and Fauna Day
To build interest and awareness for Indonesian flora and fauna, the government declared the 5th of November as National Love Flora and Fauna Day. Annually there are postage stamps released in honor of this holiday. They depict plants and animals that are endemic or unique to a specific region or a province of Indonesia.

Current Issues
Deforestation is a major problem in Indonesia. The current rate is a loss of 2 million hectares per year. As a highly populous, developing country that is industrializing rapidly, the need of natural resources and land is steadily increasing. Illegally created wildfires cause heavy smog around Indonesia's neighbouring countries.

According to the Indonesian department of forestry, there are currently 174 plants endemic to Indonesia listed as endangered species.

Maintaining the balance between the economic growth of the nation and the preservation of its natural heritage is not an easy task. Just like other developing nations, Indonesia is battling to keep this balance. Ecotourism might be one solution to this problem. Using its biodiversity as a tool rather than exploiting it, Indonesia might improve the economic standing of its isolated regions.

See also

 List of Indonesian floral emblems
 List of national parks of Indonesia
 Geography of Indonesia
 Fauna of Indonesia

References

External links
 ASEAN Regional Centre for Biodiversity Conservation
 The Biodiversity hotspots
  PIKA Database of endemic Flora and Fauna in Indonesia
 An article about Indonesian vegetation
Digital Flora of Indonesia